Tingena anaema is a species of moth in the family Oecophoridae. It is endemic to New Zealand and has been collected at Lake Wakatipu, Invercargill and Stewart Island / Rakiura. The adults of the species are on the wing in December.

Taxonomy
This species was first described by Edward Meyrick in 1883 using specimens collected at Lake Wakatipu in December and named Oecophora anaema. Meyrick gave a more detailed description under this name in 1884. In 1915 Meyrick placed this species within the Borkhausenia genus. In 1926 Alfred Philpott was unable to study the genitalia of the male of this species as a result of no specimens being available in New Zealand collections. George Hudson discussed this species under the name B. anaema in his 1928 publication The butterflies and moths of New Zealand. In 1988 J. S. Dugdale placed this species in the genus Tingena. The male lectotype is held at the Natural History Museum, London.

Description
Meyrick originally described this species as follows:

Meyrick described the male of the species in more detail as follows:

Meyrick stated that this species could be distinguished from its close relatives by the dark colouration on its head as well as on its thorax except for a small lateral patch. The forewings have a dull appearance as a result of fine brown speckles, visible under a microscope.

Distribution

It is endemic to New Zealand. This species has been observed in Invercargill, Stewart Island and Lake Wakatipu.

Behaviour
The adults of this species are on the wing in December.

References

Oecophoridae
Moths of New Zealand
Moths described in 1883
Endemic fauna of New Zealand
Taxa named by Edward Meyrick
Endemic moths of New Zealand